Bozorg Ab (also Romanized as Bozorg Āb and Bozorgāb) is a village in Mazu Rural District, Alvar-e Garmsiri District, Andimeshk County, Khuzestan Province, Iran. At the 2006 census, its population was 46, in 9 families.

References 

Populated places in Andimeshk County